Scotoleon is a genus of antlions in the family Myrmeleontidae. There are more than 20 described species in Scotoleon.

Species
These 23 species belong to the genus Scotoleon:

 Scotoleon carrizonus (Hagen, 1888)
 Scotoleon deflexus (Adams, 1957)
 Scotoleon digueti (Navás, 1913)
 Scotoleon dissimilis (Banks, 1903)
 Scotoleon eiseni (Banks, 1908)
 Scotoleon expansus (Navás, 1913)
 Scotoleon fidelitas (Adams, 1957)
 Scotoleon infuscatus (Adams, 1957)
 Scotoleon intermedius (Currie, 1903)
 Scotoleon longipalpis (Hagen, 1888)
 Scotoleon marshi (Stange, 1970)
 Scotoleon minusculus (Banks, 1899)
 Scotoleon minutus (Adams, 1957)
 Scotoleon niger (Currie, 1898)
 Scotoleon nigrescens (Stange, 1970)
 Scotoleon nigrilabris (Hagen, 1888)
 Scotoleon nivatensis (Navás, 1915)
 Scotoleon pallidus (Banks, 1899)
 Scotoleon peninsulanus (Banks, 1942)
 Scotoleon peregrinus (Hagen, 1861)
 Scotoleon quadripunctatus (Currie, 1898)
 Scotoleon singularis (Currie, 1903)
 Scotoleon yavapai (Currie, 1903)

References

Further reading

 

Myrmeleontidae
Articles created by Qbugbot